Milan Knežević may refer to:

 Milan Knežević (Montenegrin politician)
 Milan Knežević (Serbian politician)